Douglas Augusto Mendes dos Santos (born 4 October 1988 in Paulo Afonso, Bahia), known as Douglas Mendes, is Brazilian footballer who currently plays for Cascavel.

References

1988 births
Living people
Brazilian footballers
Brazilian expatriate footballers
Association football defenders
Campeonato Brasileiro Série B players
Campeonato Brasileiro Série C players
Campeonato Brasileiro Série D players
Kategoria Superiore players
Esporte Clube Bahia players
Clube de Regatas Brasil players
Colo Colo de Futebol e Regatas players
Guarany Sporting Club players
Ceará Sporting Club players
Treze Futebol Clube players
Flamurtari Vlorë players
Operário Ferroviário Esporte Clube players
Cuiabá Esporte Clube players
Paysandu Sport Club players
Esporte Clube São Bento players
FC Cascavel players
Expatriate footballers in Albania
Brazilian expatriate sportspeople in Albania